Main Maa Punjab Dee (1998) is a critically acclaimed Punjabi-language film written and directed by Balwant Dullat.  The film starred Dara Singh, Manjeet Kullar, Bhagwant Mann, Deepak Saraf, Neeru Singh, Shavinder Mahal and Ravinder Mann. The music was by Kuldeep Singh (Ankush fame) . The film was critically acclaimed and received the  National Film Award for Best Feature Film in Punjabi.   Manjeet Kullar considered her work in the film, "one of my best performances."

The film is an "exploration of a suffering mother who undergoes the trauma created by her own sons and discovers her creative talent and rehabilitates herself."

References

External links 
 

Punjabi-language Indian films
1990s Punjabi-language films
1998 films
Films shot in Punjab, India
Best Punjabi Feature Film National Film Award winners